Denis Baumgartner (born 2 February 1998) is a Slovak football player who plays for MFK Skalica.

Club career

Livorno Calcio
He made his Serie C debut for Livorno on 1 October 2017 in a game against Pontedera.

FC DAC 1904 Dunajská Streda
On 6 August 2018, Baumgartner joined to DAC Dunajská Streda on loan until 30 June 2019.

FK Senica
In the summer of 2019, Baumgartner had returned to his home club of FK Senica. He had signed a two-year deal with the team. He had left Senica in May 2020, amidst the coronavirus pandemic, as he apparently had a fall-out with club leadership over salary cuts during the pandemic. On top of 18 goal-less league appearances, Baumgartner also competed in 4 Slovnaft Cup matches and he scored a single goal.

MFK Skalica
On 4 February 2021, Baumgartner had signed a one-year contract with Slovak second division club MFK Skalica after half-year without an affiliation.

References

External links
 

1998 births
Living people
Sportspeople from Skalica
Slovak footballers
Slovak expatriate footballers
Association football midfielders
Slovakia youth international footballers
FK Senica players
FC DAC 1904 Dunajská Streda players
U.C. Sampdoria players
U.S. Livorno 1915 players
MFK Skalica players
Slovak Super Liga players
2. Liga (Slovakia) players
Serie C players
Expatriate footballers in Italy
Slovak expatriate sportspeople in Italy